Chesterfield F.C. is a team in the Football League One. In the 2014-2015 season they came a respectable 6th place in the league to qualify for the league play-offs.

Pre-season friendlies

Competitions

League One

League table

Matches
The fixtures for the 2014–15 season were announced on 18 June 2014 at 9am.

Play Offs

FA Cup

The draw for the first round of the FA Cup was made on 27 October 2014.

League Cup

The draw for the first round was made on 17 June 2014 at 10am. Chesterfield were drawn at home to Huddersfield Town.

Football League Trophy

Transfers

In

Out

Loans In

Loans Out

See also
List of Chesterfield F.C. seasons

References

Chesterfield F.C. seasons
Chesterfield